Epideira is a genus of sea snails, marine gastropod mollusks in the family Horaiclavidae.

Species
Species within the genus Epideira include:
 Epideira beachportensis Cotton & Godfrey, 1938
 Epideira candida (Laseron, 1954)
 Epideira carinata (Laseron, 1954)
 Epideira flindersi Cotton & Godfrey, 1938
 Epideira gabensis Hedley, 1922
 Epideira hedleyi (Iredale, 1931)
 Epideira jaffaensis (Verco, 1909)
 Epideira multiseriata (E. A. Smith, 1877)
 Epideira nodulosa (Laseron, 1954)
 Epideira perksi (Verco, 1896)
 Epideira philipineri (Tenison Woods, 1877)
 Epideira quoyi (Desmoulins, 1842)
 Epideira schoutanica (May, 1911)
 Epideira sibogae (Schepman, 1913)
 Epideira striata (Gray, 1826)
 Epideira torquata Hedley, 1922
 Epideira tuberculata (Laseron, 1954)
Species brought into synonymy
 Epideira beachportensis Cotton & Godfrey, 1938: synonym of Epidirona beachportensis (Cotton & Godfrey, 1938)
 Epideira flindersi Cotton & Godfrey, 1938: synonym of Epidirona flindersi (Cotton & Godfrey, 1938)
 Epideira torquata Hedley, 1922: synonym of Epidirona torquata (Hedley, 1922)

References

 Hedley C. (1918). A checklist of the marine fauna of New South Wales. Part 1. Journal and Proceedings of the Royal Society of New South Wales. 51: M1-M120
 Li B.Q., Kilburn R.N., & Li X.Z. (2010). Report on Crassispirinae Morrison, (Mollusca: Neogastropoda: Turridae) from the China Seas. Journal of Natural History. 44, 699-740.

External links
 
 Bouchet, P.; Kantor, Y. I.; Sysoev, A.; Puillandre, N. (2011). A new operational classification of the Conoidea (Gastropoda). Journal of Molluscan Studies. 77(3): 273-308

 
Horaiclavidae
Gastropod genera